Bhawani Khera is a village in Ajmer tehsil of Ajmer district of Rajasthan state in India. The village falls under Narwar gram panchayat.

Demography 
As per 2011 census of India, Bhawani Khera has population of 3,688 of which 1,847 are males and 1,841 are females. Sex ratio of the village is 997.

Transportation
Bhawani Khera is connected by air (Kishangarh Airport), by train (Nasirabad railway station) and by road.

See also
Ajmer Tehsil
Nasirabad railway station

References

Villages in Ajmer district